Argentine singer and rapper Paulo Londra has released two studio albums, one mixtape and 20 singles (including two as a featured artist). He gained popularity with singles "Cuando Te Besé" and "Adán y Eva", both which topped the Billboard Argentina Hot 100. In May 2019, Londra released his debut studio album, Homerun, which peaked at number 12 on the Billboard Top Latin Albums chart. In July, Londra appeared as a featured artist on Ed Sheeran's track "Nothing on You" from the album No.6 Collaborations Project.

Albums

Studio albums

Mixtapes
 Dímelo (2018)

Singles

As lead artist

As a featured artist

Other charted songs

Guest appearances

Notes

References

Discographies of Argentine artists
Reggaeton discographies